St Austell Voice is a paid-for weekly newspaper that is published each Wednesday. The paper was launched in 2005 and is the sister title to the Newquay Voice. It covers the south half of the former Borough of Restormel, Cornwall, UK, while the Newquay Voice covers the north. It was launched to meet the need for a locally focussed newspaper and the entire production process with the exception of printing is based in St Austell. The paper currently consists of three full-time journalists, Natasha Swift, Jo Sampson and Gareth Rowett, plus a staff photographer Paul Williams as well as an advertising team. The paper is edited by Phillip Lamphee, formerly of the Daily Mirror group.

In 2006, The Newquay Voice teamed up with Newquay Based Photography Company "Cornwall-Photos.com", to enable readers to view and purchase photos featured in each week's papers through either the Voice website, or Cornwall-Photos.com. This was expanded to include the St. Austell Voice in May 2009.

External links

 Hold The Front Page website listing

Newspapers published in Cornwall
St Austell